Wilhelm Süssmann (16 September 1891 – 20 May 1941) was a German general in the Luftwaffe (Air Force) during World War II who was killed in action during the Battle of Crete.

Süssmann was the first commander of the 55th Bomber Wing, from its formation on 1 May 1939 to 6 March 1940. He commanded the 2nd Fallschirmjäger Regiment and later the 7th Flieger Division during the Battle of Crete during which he was killed in action when the DFS 230 glider carrying him and his staff crashed on the island of Aegina. A Ju 52 aircraft was towing the glider when a sudden maneuver generated a slipstream, sending the glider into an uncontrolled dive.

References

 de Zeng, H.L; Stankey, D.G; Creek, E.J. Bomber Units of the Luftwaffe 1933–1945; A Reference Source, Volume 1. Ian Allan Publishing, 2007. 
 Shores, Christopher, Brian Cull and Maria Malizia. Air War for Yugoslavia, Greece and Crete: 1940–41. London: Grub Street, 1992. .
 Mrazek, James E. Airborne Combat: The Glider War/Fighting Gliders of WWII, Mechanicsburg: Stackpole Books, 2011. 

1891 births
1941 deaths
Luftwaffe World War II generals
Lieutenant generals of the Luftwaffe
Luftwaffe personnel killed in World War II
People from Greifswald
Military personnel from Mecklenburg-Western Pomerania
German Army personnel of World War I